Sycacantha diakonoffi is a moth of the family Tortricidae. It is found in Thailand and Vietnam.

References

Moths described in 1987
Olethreutini
Sycacantha